Antonio Escobar Huerta (14 November 1879, Ceuta – 8 February 1940) was a Spanish military officer.

Biography
Escobar was a Catholic and a conservative. At the outbreak of the Spanish Civil War, he was a colonel of the Spanish Civil Guard in the city of Barcelona. He remained loyal to the republican government and on 19 July with his 800 men aided decisively to the defeat of the coup in Barcelona. Later he was promoted to General, and in January 1939, he led the Republican forces in the failed Valsequillo Offensive. On 16 February 1939, he was one of the officers who said to the Prime Minister Juan Negrin that further military resistance was impossible. In March 1939, he was the commander of the Extremadura Army, supported Casado's coup and crushed the Communist resistance in Ciudad Real.

On 26 March 1939, he was captured by the Nationalists and executed on 8 February 1940 in Barcelona. He was buried in the Montjuïc Cemetery, Barcelona.

See also
List of people executed by Francoist Spain

Notes

References
Beevor, Antony. (2006). The Battle for Spain. The Spanish Civil War, 1936-1939. Penguin Books. London.
Jackson, Gabriel. (1967). The Spanish Republic and the Civil War, 1931-1939. Princeton University Press. Princeton.
Thomas, Hugh. (2001). The Spanish Civil War. Penguin Books. London.

1879 births
1940 deaths
People from Ceuta
Spanish army officers
Spanish military personnel of the Spanish Civil War (Republican faction)
People executed by Francoist Spain
Executed Spanish people
Spanish Roman Catholics